A hexafluoroplatinate is a chemical compound which contains the hexafluoroplatinate  anion.  It is produced by combining substances with platinum hexafluoride.

Examples of hexafluoroplatinates

 Dioxygenyl hexafluoroplatinate (O2PtF6), containing the rare dioxygenyl oxycation.
 Xenon hexafluoroplatinate ("XePtF6"), the first noble gas compound ever synthesised. (The Xe+ ion in XePtF6 is unstable, being a radical; as a result, XePtF6 itself is unstable and quickly disproportionates into XeFPtF5, XeFPt2F11, and Xe2F3PtF6.)

See also
 Hexachloroplatinate

References

Anions
Fluorometallates